South Lincolnshire, formally called the Southern Division of Lincolnshire or Parts of Kesteven and Holland, was a county constituency in Lincolnshire.  It returned two Members of Parliament (MPs) to the House of Commons of the Parliament of the United Kingdom, elected by the bloc vote electoral system.

History

The constituency was created by the Reform Act 1832 for the 1832 general election.  It was abolished by the Redistribution of Seats Act 1885 for the 1885 general election.

Boundaries 
1832–1868: The Parts of Kesteven and Holland.

1868–1885: The Wapentakes, Hundreds, or Sokes of Loveden, Flaxwell, Aswardburn, Winnibriggs and Threo, Aveland, Beltisloe, Ness, Grantham Soke, Skirbeck, Kirton and Holland Elloe.

Members of Parliament

Election results

Elections in the 1830s

Elections in the 1840s

Elections in the 1850s
Trollope was appointed President of the Poor Law Board, requiring a by-election.

Elections in the 1860s

Trollope was elevated to the peerage, becoming Lord Kesteven, causing a by-election.

Elections in the 1870s

Elections in the 1880s

 

Welby-Gregory resigned, causing a by-election.

See also
 Stamford (UK Parliament list of constituencies)

References 

 

Parliamentary constituencies in Lincolnshire (historic)
Constituencies of the Parliament of the United Kingdom established in 1832
Constituencies of the Parliament of the United Kingdom disestablished in 1885